Moorella is a genus of saprophytic fungi within the Ascomycota (it has been originally classified within the former taxa Dematiaceae, Helicosporae). It is named Moorella in honour of mycologist Royall T. Moore, because of his contributions to Helicosporae.

Moorella speciosa is the type species of this genus, an anamorph fungus that has been collected growing on dead bark in Nizamabad, India.

The GBIF also list; 
 Moorella heterospora 
 Moorella monocephala

References

Ascomycota enigmatic taxa
Ascomycota genera